The House of Kantakouzenos ( Kantakouzenoi; , pl. Καντακουζηνοί), Latinized as Cantacuzenus and anglicized as Cantacuzene, was one of the most prominent Greek noble families of the Byzantine Empire in the last centuries of its existence. The family was one of the Empire's wealthiest and provided several prominent governors and generals, as well as two Byzantine emperors. The Kantakouzenoi intermarried extensively with other Byzantine noble families such as the Palaiologoi, the Philanthropenoi, the Asen, and the Tarchaneiotes. The feminine form of the name is Kantakouzene, Latinized as Cantacuzena.

Etymology
The origin of the family's surname, to follow Donald Nicol, "lies between romantic guesswork and philological conjecture." Prince Michael Cantacuzino, an 18th-century Romanian  aristocrat of the Cantacuzino family who traced his ancestry to this Byzantine family, provides examples of the first kind, such as the family began with a certain "Lucie Cusin" who married one "Serafina Catina", and united their familial names into the compound one of "Ca(n)tacuzino". Nicol lists some connections the Kantakouzenos had with the locale in the 11th and 13th centuries.

History
The Kantakouzenoi first appear in the reign of Alexios I Komnenos, when a member of the family campaigned against the Cumans. In the Komnenian period, members of the family are attested as military officials: the sebastos John Kantakouzenos was killed in the Battle of Myriokephalon, while his probable grandson, the Caesar John Kantakouzenos, married Irene Angelina, the sister of Isaac II Angelos. By the time of the Fourth Crusade, the Kantakouzenoi were among the greatest landholders in the Empire.

They remained prominent in the Palaiologan period. Michael Kantakouzenos was appointed governor of the Morea in 1308 and his son, John VI Kantakouzenos, rose to be megas domestikos, regent, and eventually emperor (1341–1354) before resigning and retiring to a monastery after a failed civil war. John VI's eldest son Matthew also reigned as his co-emperor and as a pretender (1353–1357) before being captured and forced to resign as well. John's younger son Manuel Kantakouzenos remained despotes of the Morea from 1349 until 1380. Of John VI's daughters, Helena Kantakouzene married John and Matthew's rival John V Palaiologos (r. 1341–1391), Maria married Nikephoros II Orsini of Epirus, and Theodora married the Ottoman bey Orhan I.

Matthew's two sons, John and Demetrios, ruled briefly the Morea. 
It is generally believed that John, about whom relatively few documents have survived, died childless, and that the numerous Kantakouzenoi of the following generation, as well as the historian Theodore Spandounes and the wife of genealogist Hugues Busac, trace their descent from Matthew through Demetrios. The possible descendants of Demetrios (the exact parentage is uncertain) were Georgios, called "Sachatai"; Andronikos, the last megas domestikos of the Byzantine Empire; Irene, who married Đurađ Branković; Thomas, who served in Branković's court; Helena, who became the second wife of David of Trebizond; and an unnamed daughter, who may have become queen of Georgia.

See also
Cantacuzino, a family of Phanariote and Romanian boyars who trace their descent from the Kantakouzenoi
Serbian Orthodox Secondary School "Kantakuzina Katarina Branković" in Zagreb, Croatia is named after one of Irene Kantakouzene daughters Kantakuzina Katarina Branković, there is also Order of Kantakuzina Katarina Branković named after her.

Family tree of the Imperial House of Kantakouzenos

See also
 History of the Byzantine Empire
 Palaiologos dynasty and related family tree
 Byzantine Empire under the Palaiologos dynasty

References

Sources

Further reading 
 Donald M. Nicol, "The Byzantine Family of Kantakouzenos: Some Addenda and Corrigenda" Dumbarton Oaks Papers, 27 (1973), pp. 309-315

Kantakouzenos family
Greek noble families